The 2011 Canterbury City Council election took place on 5 May 2011 to elect members of the Canterbury City Council in Kent, England. This was on the same day as other local elections. The Conservative Party retained control of the council.

References

2011 English local elections
May 2011 events in the United Kingdom
2011
2010s in Kent